The 1988 Giro d'Italia began on 23 May, and stage 11 occurred on 2 June. The 1988 edition began with a short  individual time trial around the city of Urbino. The following two days of racing were normal mass-start stages, before the fourth day of racing consisted of two half-stages, the first a normal stage and the latter a  team time trial. The rest of the opening half of the race – remaining within Italy for the duration – consisted of stages with or without categorized climbs.

Jean-François Bernard became the first race leader, as he won the opening stage in Urbino; the first of two stage wins that Bernard achieved during the opening half of the race, along with the eighth stage. As a result, Bernard was the second rider to win multiple stages in the opening half of the race, after Guido Bontempi who won stages 2 and 5. Bernard lost the race leader's maglia rosa after stage 4a to Massimo Podenzana, who had been a part of a breakaway that survived and finished minutes ahead of the peloton. Podenzana held the lead all the way to the end of the eleventh stage.

Stage 1
23 May 1988 — Urbino, 

The first stage of the 1988 edition of the event was a  individual time trial that navigated the streets of Urbino. An El Mundo Deportivo writer stated that the course was fast. The first  were the fastest section of the course because the route was downhill. After the course passed the railroad station in Urbino, the course began to increase slightly in elevation until the finish. The writer also noted two bends, one at Via della Stazione ( in) and the other at Ciale Comandino ( in), which he classified as "dangerous." The first rider was scheduled to start at 13:30 local time.

Greg LeMond suffered from a dropped chain halfway through the course, which caused him to post a "horrible" time according to El País writer Luis Gómez. Tony Rominger, Erik Breukink, and Erich Maechler chose to use rear lenticular wheels instead of a traditional wheel with spokes. Rominger came in second overall with a time of 13' 10", Breukink came in fourth at 13' 15", and Maechler came in third after finishing with the same time as Breukink. After the stage, Rominger told reporters that his time slower than it could have been due to a fall that occurred due to his front wheel being too inflated. Pedro Delgado (Reynolds), who rode a standard bike, finished in twentieth position, twenty-eight seconds behind stage winner Jean-François Bernard. Bernard traversed the course with the fastest time of 13' 07" at a pace of 41.168 km/h. With the time bonuses added to the top three finisher's times, Bernard's lead was increased to eight seconds over Rominger.

Stage 2
24 May 1988 — Urbino to Ascoli Piceno, 

The second stage of the race was one of the longer ones in the race and featured two third category climbs, the Santa Vittoria and the Valico Croce di Casaleo. The intermediate sprint for the stage was located  into the stage in Fossombrona. The first categorized climb was  set to be crossed after  had been covered, and the second after . With the last climb coming over twenty kilometers before the finish of the stage, it was expected that the stage would finish with a field sprint. The stage was set to begin at 10:30 local time.

All 180 riders started the second stage of the race in Urbino. The peloton remained intact through the intermediate sprint. Alessio Di Basco (Fanini–Seven Up) won the sprint and was followed by Domenico Cavallo (Isoglass-Galli) and Paul Popp (Malvor–Bottecchia) in second and third, respectively.

Renato Piccolo (Gewiss–Bianchi) was the first over the climb of the Santa Vittoria. Stefano Giuliani won the sprint to the top of Croce di Casale, while Piccolo came in third. Giuliani's points gained during the day were enough to give him the lead in the mountains classification.

Angelo Lecchi (Del Tongo–Colnago) and Giuliani were caught with six kilometers to go in the leg. Guido Bontempi won the sprint finish.

Stage 3
25 May 1988 — Ascoli Piceno to Vasto,

Stage 4a
26 May 1988 — Vasto to Rodi Garganico,

Stage 4b
26 May 1988 — Rodi Garganico to Vieste,

Stage 5
27 May 1988 — Vieste to Santa Maria Capua Vetere,

Stage 6
28 May 1988 — Santa Maria Capua Vetere to Campitello Matese,

Stage 7
29 May 1988 — Campitello Matese to Avezzano,

Stage 8
30 May 1988 — Avezzano to Chianciano Terme,

Stage 9
31 May 1988 — Pienza to Marina di Massa,

Stage 10
1 June 1988 — Carrara to Salsomaggiore Terme,

Stage 11
2 June 1988 — Parma to Colle Don Bosco, 

The eleventh leg of the event was very flat and contained no categorized climbs. It was expected to be one of the last opportunities for the sprinters in the race to get a chance at a stage win. The stage's start was scheduled for 11:00 local time and was speculated to be finished at around 4:30.

He rode solo and without issue until the closing kilometers of the race where fifty environmentalist protestors blocked the road. The protestors were upset with a nearby factory, owned by chemical manufacturer Montedison, which the protestors claimed had been polluting the Bormida river. Stutz rode through the mass of people and went on to finish the stage in first position. The peloton, however, struggled to get past the protestors, which led race director Vincenzo Torriani to cancel the stage. The cancelling of the stage left no winner and the general classification standings were left unchanged.

References

Footnotes

Citations

1988 Giro d'Italia
Giro d'Italia stages